Parliamentary elections were held in the Maldives in September and October 1974. All candidates ran as independents.

Electoral system
The People's Majlis had 54 seats, of which 46 were elected and eight appointed by the President. Eight of the elected members were from Malé, with two from each of the 19 districts.

Results

Aftermath
When the newly elected Majlis convened in February 1975, it re-elected Ahmed Zaki as Prime Minister. However, the following month, president Ibrahim Nasir declared a state of emergency and removed Zaki from office. The post of Prime Minister was subsequently abolished.

References

Maldives
Parliamentary election
Elections in the Maldives
Non-partisan elections
Election and referendum articles with incomplete results